Hot Springs Landing is a census-designated place in Sierra County, New Mexico, United States. Its population was 110 as of the 2010 census. The community is located on the western shore of Elephant Butte Reservoir.

Geography

Demographics

Education
Truth or Consequences Municipal Schools is the school district for the entire county. Truth or Consequences Middle School and Hot Springs High School, both in Truth or Consequences, are the district's secondary schools.

References

Census-designated places in New Mexico
Census-designated places in Sierra County, New Mexico